News stories and features, whether in magazine writing or broadcast news, can be categorized in terms of article structures that define the order in which information is introduced to the story.  Some writers deny consciously organizing articles according to specific structures, but may use them to describe the writing post hoc.  Others recognize a style within a developing story and use it to develop the narrative. Still, others may be required to pursue a specific style from the beginning by publisher guidelines.

Structures 
Some of the structure types include:

Inverted pyramid 
The inverted pyramid structure begins with the latest or most important developments, then provides greater description and detail, tapering off with less significant events of relevance.  Proponents of this structure, which is common in news reporting, may criticize other styles as "burying the lead", though others criticize it as a dull style that "tells the joke by starting at the punch line". Because this structure is designed to permit truncation by an editor, authors do not need to plan a specific ending as they might with other styles. However not all articles contain all elements of the pyramid

Narrative 
A narrative structure is a straightforward, chronological description of events.  For example, an article about a set of murders may begin with the discovery of the first victim and end with the imprisonment or execution of a suspect.

Hourglass 
The hourglass structure is a combination of inverted pyramid and narrative structures.  The author begins with key details (who, what, when, where, and why), and adds details of increasingly lower importance as in the inverted pyramid structure.  The story then abruptly "turns", requiring a clear transition, to focus on a narrative, such as the story of a specific eyewitness or party, which addresses finer details and implications, before making its final conclusion. Like the inverted pyramid, it attempts to satisfy readers who don't complete the article, while continuing to engage readers with greater interest. In broadcast news reporting, the narrative portion may be provided by a reporter on the scene, while the beginning and end are told by an anchor at the studio.  The simple narrative portion may be convenient for reporters writing under a deadline.insta= radpie_

Nut-graph 
An article may begin with an anecdotal "hook" to catch the reader's attention.  This is followed by a "nut graph" paragraph that summarizes the story as a whole.  Body paragraphs then explore these ideas in greater detail, provide useful background, or explain conflicting opinions.

Diamond 
The diamond structure is similar to a nut graph, with anecdotal hook, nut graph, and a wealth of general detail, but then progressively narrows these issues and applies them to the anecdote introduced in the hook.  The story may be considered as a "quest" to understand the situation of a single individual. A journalism class may require this structure for an opinion story.

Christmas tree 
The "Christmas tree" shape of this story broadens out from the introduction and a series of internal turning points or surprises within the narrative, before coming to a final conclusion.  For example, the subject may be revealed to (a) have HIV, (b) be unresponsive to existing drugs, (c) learn of an experimental study, but (d) doesn't know if it will work.  Each of these turning points provides the basis for further development of the story.

Organic 
The organic structure, as expounded by Jon Franklin, is composed at its most basic level of visual imagery that provides a cinematic feel.  These are linked into "foci" that detail an action, which are in turn linked by "transitions in time, mood, subject and character".  A typical sequence of foci may be complication, development, and resolution.

Five-boxes 
Credited to Rick Bragg, the "five boxes" of this structure are a standard progression: A hook that attracts the reader's attention with a specific image or detail; a nut graph summary; a second lead that introduces remaining facts; details of secondary importance; and a "kicker": a strong image, comment, or quotation that provides a strong conclusion.

See also 
 Journalism
 Mainstream media

References 

Journalism
Mass media
Writing
Copy editing
Prose
Broadcast journalism